Plesienchelys is a monospecific genus of marine ray-finned fish belonging to the family Zoarcidae, the eelpouts. Its only species is Plesienchelys stehmanni, which is found in the southwestern Atlantic Ocean from the Río de la Plata to the Falkland Islands.

References

Lycodinae
Fish described in 1977
Monotypic ray-finned fish genera